Vadim Viktorovich Skripchenko (born 26 November 1975) is a Belarusian professional football coach and a former player. He is the manager of Dinamo Minsk.

Player career
He made his professional debut in the Belarusian Premier League in 1993 for Dinamo-93 Minsk.

Manager career
In June 2015, he was hired as an assistant manager with Ural Sverdlovsk Oblast. On 3 September 2015, he was hired as caretaker manager for Ural after the resignation of Viktor Goncharenko. He was appointed the permanent Ural manager on 22 September 2015. On 1 November 2016, he resigned as Ural manager.

On 3 November 2016, he was appointed the manager of FC Krylia Sovetov Samara. He was replaced as a manager of Krylia Sovetov after the club was relegated from the Russian Premier League at the end of the 2016–17 season.

On 14 August 2017, he was hired by FC Anzhi Makhachkala. Anzhi was relegated from the Russian Premier League at the end of the season after losing to FC Yenisey Krasnoyarsk in relegation play-offs and his contract was not extended.

Honours

Player
Dinamo-93 Minsk
 Belarusian Cup winner: 1994–95

BATE Borisov
 Belarusian Premier League champion: 1999, 2002
 Belarusian Cup winner: 2005–06

Manager
Minsk
 Belarusian Cup winner: 2012–13

References

External links

1975 births
Living people
People from Malaryta District
Sportspeople from Brest Region
Belarusian footballers
Association football midfielders
Belarus international footballers
Belarus under-21 international footballers
Belarusian expatriate footballers
Expatriate footballers in Russia
Belarusian Premier League players
Russian Premier League players
FC Dinamo-93 Minsk players
FC Traktor Minsk players
FC BATE Borisov players
PFC CSKA Moscow players
FC Elista players
FC Shakhtyor Soligorsk players
FC Vitebsk players
FC Savit Mogilev players
Belarusian football managers
Belarusian expatriate football managers
Expatriate football managers in Russia
Russian Premier League managers
FC Minsk managers
FC Ural Yekaterinburg managers
PFC Krylia Sovetov Samara managers
FC Anzhi Makhachkala managers
FC Torpedo Zhodino managers
FC Dinamo Minsk managers